General elections were held in Fiji on 23 March and 10 April 1908.

Electoral system
The Legislative Council consisted of ten civil servants, six elected Europeans and two appointed Fijians. The six Europeans were elected from three constituencies; Levuka (one seat), Suva (two seats) and a "Planters" constituency covering the rest of the colony (three seats). Voting was restricted to European men aged 21 or over who were British subjects and earned at least £120 a year or owned property with a yearly value of £20.

Voting was held in Levuka and Suva on 23 March, and in the Planters constituency on 10 April.

Results

Nominated members

References

1908 elections in Oceania
1908 in Fiji
1908
1908 elections in the British Empire